The three-day movement refers to a network of religious groups conducting spiritual retreats to enrich the lives of fellow Christians. Sustained by secular clergy, the laity, and other previous participants, the movement is associated with a retreat spanning three days. Some adherents proclaim the life of an attendee transforms on the fourth day.

Such retreats began as an apostolic movement on the island of Mallorca, where a group of Catholic laity first developed the Cursillo in 1944. With participation unrestricted by Christian denomination, the Cursillo soon spread to other countries. In time Cursillo attendees developed similar programs tailored to specific audience groups, including programs for younger people, for the incarcerated or those affected by incarceration, and at times for particular denominational approaches.

Some organizations within the three-day movement license Cursillo material, while other groups develop similar programs under another name, or even deviate from the three-day structure. The broader three-day movement enjoys much collaboration: different organized groups provide mutual ongoing support, expressed through prayer, sending letters, and other means. The general lack of denominational requirements among participants allows for the movement's collaborative nature.

Specific programs
 Cursillo, the Catholic three-day event
 Episcopal Cursillo, known in some countries as Anglican Cursillo.
 Lutheran Via de Cristo.
 Chayah, a ministry to young jail inmates based on Lutheran Cursillo.
 Presbyterian Pilgrimage
 Tres Dias.
 Emmaus Ministries 
 Walk to Emmaus, a ministry of The Upper Room 
 Chrysalis, for high school students
 Face to Face, for  older adults in a residential setting
ACTS [Catholic, but open to all faiths]
 Alarga, for those for whom a normal three-day program would be physically challenging.
 Kairos Prison Ministry.
 Kairos Torch, for juvenile detainees.
 Kairos Outside, for those affected by an incarceration.
 Awakening
 Keryx Prison Ministry, for Michigan penal system
 Keryx In Community, a non-denominational ministry held in local churches in Michigan
 Michigan Youth Challenge Academy (MYCA) a "boot camp" program for at-risk teens
 G12 Vision, the movement led by Colombian charismatic pastor Cesar Castellanos, with its controversial “Encuentros” weekend program

External links
 http://cursillos.ca/en/index.htm French-speaking Cursillo in Canada (English version)
 http://www.anglicancursillo.org.au/ Anglican Cursillo Australia
 http://emmaus.upperroom.org/International Walk to Emmaus
 http://chrysalis.upperroom.org/ Chrysalis
 http://facetoface.upperroom.org/ Face to Face 
 http://www.africasouth.org.za/wp.aspx?i=27 What is Alarga?
 http://www.kairosprisonministry.org/ Kairos Prison Ministry International
 http://www.kairos.org.au/ Kairos Prison Ministry Australia
 http://www.actsmissions.org/2013-03-06-20-32-25/history-of-acts  ACTS History of ACTS
 https://www.lampstand.net/great-banquet/ Image of The Great Banquet

Spiritual retreats